Melitrén, also known as Tren del Maipo is a planned 61 km commuter railway line in the Chilean capital of Santiago, designed to link it with neighbouring town Melipilla, to be operated by Empresa de los Ferrocarriles del Estado.

Background
EFE had been planning a suburban service between Santiago and Melipilla since the mid-1990s. The project got to the tendering stage, but there were no bidders due to an underestimated budget requirement and disagreements between EFE and Santiago Metro over the location of the city centre terminal. However the first stage as far as Malloco formed part of the company's 2014-16 development plan. Yet, works were not initiated, one problem being an inability to obtain environmental approval. 
In May 2019, environmental approval was granted for the project to introduce a commuter rail service running 25km from Santiago to Malloco on the line to Melipilla. Construction of this first stage is due to begin in 2020 and open in 2025, at a cost of US$1.56 billion.

Stations
Alameda 
Estación Central 2
Lo Errázuriz  
Américo Vespucio
Pajaritos
Tres Poniente
Ciudad Satélite
Padre Hurtado
Malloco
Talagente
El Monte
Melipilla

See also
Metrotren
Santiago-Batuco commuter rail

References

Transport in Chile
Rail transport in Chile
Proposed railway lines